Oleksandr Medved (born 13 September 1996 in Kyiv, Ukraine) is a professional Ukrainian football defender/midfielder who plays for SC Chaika.

Career
Medved is a product of the FC Obolon-Zmina Kyiv Youth Sportive School System. His first trainer was Sergei Soldatov.

Then he signed a professional contract with FC Dnipro Dnipropetrovsk in the Ukrainian Premier League and subsequently with another Ukrainian Premier League's club FC Chornomorets Odesa. But he played only in the Ukrainian Premier League Reserves and never made debut for the main-squad teams.

References

External links
 
 

Living people
1996 births
Footballers from Kyiv
Ukrainian footballers
Association football midfielders
FC Obolon-Brovar Kyiv players
FC Volyn Lutsk players
FC Helios Kharkiv players
PFC Sumy players
FC Cherkashchyna players
FC Kalush players
SC Chaika Petropavlivska Borshchahivka players
Ukrainian First League players
Ukrainian Second League players